Leonardo Mayer chose to not defend his 2008 title.
Juan Ignacio Chela became the new champion, by beating João Souza 6–4, 4–6, 6–4 in the final match.

Seeds

Draw

Finals

Top half

Bottom half

References
 Main Draw
 Qualifying Draw

Seguros Bolivar Open Medellin - Singles
2009 Singles